Héctor Fernando Farías López (born in Llolleo, San Antonio on 27 July 1932) is a Chilean actor. He is recognized mainly for his participation in TV series for many decades, including his most famous comedy characters such Señor Retamales in Los Venegas, as Don Genaro in Los 80 and as "Pelao" Saavedra in BKN among others.

He studied at the School of Theater of the University of Concepción, TUC, a period where he also began his membership in the Communist Party. During the 1980s, and after leaving the Tejas Verdes detention and torture center, he dedicated himself to political theater.

He has a long history in cinema, participating in films such as "Cachimba" Silvio Caiozzi), "Bad Times" (Cristián Sánchez), "Round Business" (Ricardo Carrasco), "El Chacotero Sentimental" (Cristián Galaz), among others.

On television he has participated in series such as "Los 80", "Los títeres", "Semidiós", among others.

Filmography

Film 
 El desquite (1999)
 El chacotero sentimental (1999) como papá de Juan
 Sobre mi Sangre (2000) como Vagabundo
 Negocio redondo (2001) como Cañaco.
 Cachimba (2004) como Don Jorge.
 Promedio rojo (2004) como El abuelo.
 La gravedad del púgil (2005) como Don Arturo, el entrenador.
 Grado 3 (2009) como Armando.
 Super, todo chile adentro (2009) como Sr. Farías
 Barrio universitario (2013) como Doctor Artazar.

Telenovelas

Series and unitaries

TV programs 
 Pase lo que pase (1998–2002) – Invitado
 Dime por qué? (TVN, 2011) – Invitado
 El late  (CHV, 2012) – Invitado
 Mi barrio, tu mejor compañía (2021)

Publicity 
 DFSK (2014) – Don Genaro.
 Banco BCI (2011) – Don Leo.
 San José (2012) – Abuelo.
 Crush (2012) – Tata Naranjo.
 Adiós Playas Privadas – Gobierno de Chile (2013) – Abuelo.
 Navidad Segura – Carabineros de Chile (2013) – Viejo Pascuero.
 Vuelve a clases – Carabineros de Chile (2014) – Don Fernando, el conductor.
 Woki toki – 42 frases típicas de los papás (2014) – protagonista

References 

1932 births
Living people
Chilean television actors
Chilean film actors
People from San Antonio, Chile
20th-century Chilean actors
21st-century Chilean actors